Kenneth Douglas Frailing (January 19, 1948 – August 26, 2022) was an American professional baseball player, a left-handed pitcher who appeared in 116 Major League games for the Chicago White Sox (1972–1973) and Chicago Cubs (1974–1976).

He appeared in four games as a relief pitcher that year, then ten more in 1973 during a year largely spent with the Triple-A Iowa Oaks. However, his success in the minor leagues that season — he won 11 of 14 decisions with a stellar 2.86 earned run average and was named to the official American Association All-Star Team — attracted the attention of the crosstown Cubs who acquired Frailing along with Steve Stone and Steve Swisher from the White Sox for Ron Santo on December 11, 1973. Jim Kremmel was also sent to the Cubs to complete the transaction one week later on December 18.

Frailing made the 1974 Cubs' Major League roster and appeared in 55 games as a "swing" man, making 16 starts and compiling a 6–9 record and a 3.88 earned run average in  innings pitched. On May 27, he registered his only MLB complete game, a 12–4 triumph over the San Francisco Giants at Wrigley Field, despite surrendering 15 hits. Notably, though, Frailing helped his own cause as a batter that day, with three hits in four at bats and three runs batted in. Frailing made 41 more appearances for the Cubs, all in relief, in 1975, but his ERA ballooned to 5.43. He began 1976 in promising fashion, with only one earned run allowed in his first  innings pitched, but a lingering shoulder injury shut him down and effectively ended his career. He pitched in only 16 games in 1976 and 15 in 1977, all but six of them in the minor leagues, and retired as an active player after the 1978 season.

During his MLB career, Frailing made 19 starts and 97 relief appearances. He allowed 252 hits and 82 bases on balls, with 136 strikeouts, in  innings pitched. He compiled a 10–16 (3.96) record with two saves.

Frailing died suddenly on August 26, 2022, at the age of 74.

References

External links 

 

1948 births
2022 deaths
Appleton Foxes players
Baseball players from Wisconsin
Chicago Cubs players
Chicago White Sox players
Fox Cities Foxes players
Iowa Oaks players
Knoxville Sox players
Lynchburg White Sox players
Major League Baseball pitchers
Mobile White Sox players
Sportspeople from Madison, Wisconsin
Tucson Toros players
Wichita Aeros players